Université du Sahel (UNIS) is located in Dakar, Senegal. It was founded in 1998.

References

External links 
Université du Sahel Official Website

Universities in Senegal
French West Africa
Educational institutions established in 1998
1998 establishments in Senegal